Fernando Torrent Guidi (born 2 October 1991) is an Argentine professional footballer who plays as a midfielder for Rosario Central, on loan from Arsenal de Sarandí.

Career
Torrent started his career with San Martin de Pérez Millán in 1997, before joining Defensores de Belgrano's youth in 2004. In 2011, Torrent scored his first senior goal during a play-off second leg against Torneo Argentino A's Estudiantes, which secured promotion to the third tier. His league debut arrived in November 2012 versus Guillermo Brown, which was the first of forty-four appearances in his first three seasons; whilst also scoring four more goals. January 2015 saw Torrent depart the club on loan, signing for Primera B Metropolitana side Brown. He scored two goals as Brown won the 2015 title and promotion.

He returned to his parent club for the 2016 Torneo Federal A, remaining the 2016, 2016–17 and 2017–18 seasons. On 30 June 2018, Torrent completed a move to Arsenal de Sarandí of Primera B Nacional.

After two years at Arsenal, Torrent moved to Rosario Central in September 2020 on a loan deal until the end of 2021 with a purchase option. The loan was later extended until the end of 2022.

Career statistics
.

Honours
Brown
Primera B Metropolitana: 2015

References

External links

1991 births
Living people
People from Arrecifes
Argentine footballers
Association football midfielders
Torneo Argentino B players
Torneo Argentino A players
Torneo Federal A players
Primera B Metropolitana players
Primera Nacional players
Defensores de Belgrano de Villa Ramallo players
Club Atlético Brown footballers
Arsenal de Sarandí footballers
Rosario Central footballers
Sportspeople from Buenos Aires Province